Nikita Gross is a Russian glamour model and former pornographic actress. In 1998 she won the X-Rated Critics Organization Award for Best New Starlet. She was Penthouse Pet of the Month for July 1998 and 2000 Penthouse Pet of the Year runner-up. She was a Perfect 10 girl in January 2000.

Awards
2003 AVN Award - Best Sex Scene in a Foreign-Shot Production (shared with Cindy, Veronica B.)
1998 XRCO Award – Best Male-Female Sex Scene (shared with Mickey G)
1998 XRCO Award – Starlet of the Year

References

External links 
 
 
 

1976 births
Living people
Russian pornographic film actresses